Rodrigo Alonso Salinas Muñoz (born 25 February 1989) is a Chilean handball player for Bidasoa Irún and the Chilean national team.

He ranked second in the 2014 Pan American Men's Handball Championship's top goalscorers list.

Salinas reached third place with BM Granollers in the 2013/14 season of ASOBAL, being the leading scorer on the team with 128 goals.

His brother Esteban Salinas also plays handball.

Achievements 
Liga ASOBAL:
Bronze Medalist: 2014
División de Plata:
Silver Medalist: 2011
Copa del Rey de Balonmano:
Finalist: 2014
Pan American Handball Championship:
Bronze Medalist: 2010, 2012, 2014

Individual awards 
 All-Star Right Back of the Pan American Handball Championship:
2014, 2016
 Top scorer of the 2016 World Olympic Qualification 1 with 20 goals.
2020 South and Central American Men's Handball Championship: Best right back
2022 South and Central American Men's Handball Championship: Best right back

References

1989 births
Sportspeople from Viña del Mar
Chilean male handball players
Living people
Liga ASOBAL players
CB Torrevieja players
BM Granollers players
CSA Steaua București (handball) players
Chilean expatriate sportspeople in France
Chilean expatriate sportspeople in Spain
Chilean expatriate sportspeople in Romania
Expatriate handball players
Handball players at the 2007 Pan American Games
Handball players at the 2011 Pan American Games
Handball players at the 2015 Pan American Games
Handball players at the 2019 Pan American Games
Pan American Games silver medalists for Chile
Pan American Games bronze medalists for Chile
Pan American Games medalists in handball
South American Games bronze medalists for Chile
South American Games medalists in handball
Competitors at the 2018 South American Games
Medalists at the 2015 Pan American Games
Medalists at the 2011 Pan American Games
20th-century Chilean people
21st-century Chilean people